The Cape Government Railways 3rd Class 4-4-0 of 1901 was a South African steam locomotive from the pre-Union era in the Cape of Good Hope.

In 1901, the Cape Government Railways placed another six 3rd Class Wynberg Tender locomotives with a  American type wheel arrangement in suburban service in Cape Town. It was a heavier and more powerful version of the 3rd Class locomotive of 1898.

Manufacturer
Six more  Wynberg Tender passenger locomotives entered service on the Cape Government Railways (CGR) in 1901 for suburban service in Cape Town. They were built by Sharp, Stewart and Company and numbered in the range from 6 to 11.

Also designed by H.M. Beatty, these locomo­tives were very similar in design to the 3rd Class  of 1898, but larger and more powerful. They were built for speed and had the largest coupled wheels of any locomotive on the CGR to date, at  diameter.

In later years, this driving wheel size became the accepted size for mixed traffic and general purpose locomotives on mainline service in South Africa. During the rest of the steam era in South Africa, only four locomotive types were to be introduced with larger driving wheels, post-delivery modifi­cations excluded.

Service

Cape Government Railways
These locomotives were also known as Wynberg Tenders. They were also designed with reverse running in mind, with a weatherboard mounted on the six-wheeled tender’s front to protect the crew from the elements when running tender first.

South African Railways

When the Union of South Africa was established on 31 May 1910, the three Colonial government railways (CGR, Natal Government Railways and Central South African Railways) were united under a single administration to control and administer the railways, ports and harbours of the Union. Although the South African Railways and Harbours came into existence in 1910, the actual classification and renumbering of all the rolling stock of the three constituent railways were only implemented with effect from 1 January 1912.

In 1912, the six locomotives were considered obsolete by the SAR, designated Class 03 and renumbered by having the numeral "0" prefixed to their existing numbers. In SAR service, they continued to work Cape Town's suburban trains. Despite being considered obsolete, all six engines survived until c. 1918, when two were withdrawn from service. The other four survived in service until after 1931.

Works numbers
The works numbers, original numbers and renumbering of the Cape 3rd Class of 1901 are listed in the table.

References

0300
0300
4-4-0 locomotives
2′B n2 locomotives
Sharp Stewart locomotives
Cape gauge railway locomotives
Railway locomotives introduced in 1901
1901 in South Africa
Scrapped locomotives